Parker (Mojave 'Amat Kuhwely, formerly 'Ahwe Nyava) is the county seat of La Paz County, Arizona, United States, on the Colorado River in Parker Valley.  As of the 2020 census, the population of the city was 3,417.

History
Founded in 1908, the town was named after Ely Parker, the first Native American commissioner for the U.S. government. The original town site of Parker was surveyed and laid out in 1909 by Earl H. Parker, a railroad location engineer for the Arizona & California Railway. The town officially incorporated in 1948 and became the county seat for the newly created La Paz County on January 1, 1983.

Camp Colorado and Parkers Landing
The town's name and origin began when a post office called Parker was established January 6, 1871, at Parker's Landing and the site of the Parker Indian Agency, named for Ely Parker, on the Colorado River Indian Reservation, four miles downriver from the site of the railroad bridge of the modern town, to serve the Indian agency. What became Parkers Landing was established on the river as the place to land and pick up cargo and personnel for the Indian Agency and the U. S. Army detachment that was stationed there at Camp Colorado from 1864 to 1869, during the first years of the Reservation.  Camp Colorado was abandoned after wind-blown sparks from the departing steamboat Cocopah rapidly burned down the brush huts of the officers of the garrison, and endangered its barracks and storehouses.

Geography
The city is on the Colorado River just south of the Headgate Rock Dam and Moovalya Lake. Arizona State Route 95 and California State Route 62 (across the Colorado River) serve the city.

According to Census Bureau maps, the town is divided into two non-contiguous sections; the northern section consists of the original town and is located in the Colorado River Indian reservation and the southern section consists of a larger, roughly rectangular section of largely undeveloped territory. The undeveloped territory consist of extensive unpaved roads. Of the few that are paved, Mohave Road is the most utilized between the town and the territory. The same road can be taken 15.5 miles south to the town of Poston, which is noted for its relocation camps for Japanese Americans during World War II.

Climate

Parker has an arid climate classification, which is characterized by extremely hot summers and warm winters.

Wintertime highs in Parker are generally in the upper 60s to lower 70s.

April and May both average  daytime highs. This was, at the time, the all-time record high temperature in Arizona history until Lake Havasu City reached  on June 29, 1994.

Rainfall is uniformly scanty throughout the year in Parker, with no month averaging more than three days with measurable rainfall. The monsoon storms that provide much of the rain in southern and eastern parts of Arizona seldom effect Parker.

Demographics

As of the census in 2000, there were 3,140 people, 1,064 households, and 791 families residing in the town. The racial makeup of the town was 62.0% White, 1.9% Black or African American, 23.1% Native American, 0.9% Asian, 0.2% Pacific Islander, 7.5% from other races, and 4.5% from two or more races.  29.8% of the population were Hispanic or Latino of any race.

There were 1,064 households, out of which 41.5% had children under the age of 18 living with them, 51.6% were married couples living together, 15.6% had a female householder with no husband present, and 25.6% were non-families. 20.6% of all households were made up of individuals, and 8.4% had someone living alone who was 65 years of age or older.  The average household size was 2.93 and the average family size was 3.38.

In the town, the population was spread out, with 32.8% under the age of 18, 9.6% from 18 to 24, 25.4% from 25 to 44, 22.8% from 45 to 64, and 9.4% who were 65 years of age or older.  The median age was 32 years. For every 100 females, there were 93.9 males.  For every 100 females age 18 and over, there were 88.4 males.

The median income for a household in the town was $34,625, and the median income for a family was $37,663. Males had a median income of $26,542 versus $21,006 for females. The per capita income for the town was $15,016.  About 10.6% of families and 14.7% of the population were below the poverty line, including 18.2% of those under age 18 and 13.9% of those age 65 or over.

Transportation
Arizona State Route 95 runs through Parker, entering the town from the northeast as Rio Vista Highway then turning south in the intersection with California Avenue. To the north of the intersection with California Avenue is the State Route 95 truck spur, which leads to the Colorado River bridge and the eastern terminus of California State Route 62 in Earp.

Avi Suquilla Airport  is a public use airport located one nautical mile (1.8 km) east of the central business district of Parker. It is owned by the Colorado River Indian Tribes.

The Arizona & California Railroad is headquartered at the railroad depot in Parker, after replacing the Santa Fe Railway in 1991 as the owner and operator of the railroad line through the town. It crosses over the Colorado River on a five-span truss bridge near the road bridge to Earp.

La Paz County Health Department operates La Paz County Transit, an on-demand bus service.

See also

 Big River, California
 Bluewater, Arizona
 Blythe, California
 Bouse, Arizona
 Cienega Springs, Arizona
 Earp, California
 List of historic properties in Parker, Arizona
 Quartzsite, Arizona
 Parker Dam
 Parker Strip, Arizona
 Parker Valley
 Vidal, California

Gallery

References

External links
 Town website
 Parker Pioneer

Towns in La Paz County, Arizona
Communities in the Lower Colorado River Valley
Populated places in the Sonoran Desert
Lower Colorado River Valley
County seats in Arizona
Populated places established in 1908
1908 establishments in Arizona Territory